Kisong is a village in the central Sadar sub-division of West Tripura, a district of Tripura, India. It is about 5 kilometers away from the NEEPCO Power Station in Khayerpur. It is well connected with the Abhicharan village and the Durga Chowdhury village. The local church, Kisong Baptist Church, has been very active since its establishment and is also one of the oldest churches amongst the Kokborok speaking people of Tripura.

Village people
The people dwelling in this village belong to the Tripuri tribe and speak the Kokborok language. Their livelihood is mainly agriculture-based. The staple food of people here is rice.

About Christianity
The kisong Baptist Church Established in 1973 year, in these village 80% people are Christians. This church belongs to Baptist Liberal Denominations under the sadar North Baptist Association. From these Church two representative workers are working under the sadar North Baptist Association, Till now they both are working as an Evangelist, Evan, Nripendra debbarma (Joined:1 June 2009) & Evan, Somchati (Govt.) debbarma (Joined : June 2011).

About Church Office

Life Deacons:
 Sambhuram Debbarma
 Anil debbarma

Deacons:
 Radha Mohan Debbarma (Former)
 Rabi debbarma
 Subal debbarma
 Sutrang debbarma
 Bijoy debbarma (Duration, 2012-2016 March)

[Secretary] : Joseph Debbarma (employee),
[Treasure] : Dn. Rabi debbarma.
[Local pastor] : C.K Choma ( ECM Missionary). 
[Represented Worker] : Evan, Nripendra debbarmaa & Evan, Somchati Debbarma.
[Members of the Church] : 400 (Around).
[Govt. Service] : (Above)-60.

See also
 Kokborok
 Tripuri people

Agartala
Villages in West Tripura district
West Tripura district